The Islamic Resistance Movement of Azerbaijan, mostly referred to as Husayniyun, or Hüseynçilər, is an Azerbaijani Shia Islamist armed group, and socio-political movement. It is backed by Iran.

History
Tawhid Ibrahim Begli is known as the founder of this movement. He is a staunch critic of the regime of Ilham Aliyev and stated that the aim of the movement is "to create a discourse, to create a deterrent power among the Shia Muslims of Azerbaijan and to strengthen and empower them based on the model of resistance".

In late 2015 and early 2016, Tawhid Ibrahim Begli instructed 14 students from the Azerbaijan who were studying religion in Qom and Mashhad to establish a "Husseiniyun Brigade" consisting of students. Ibrahim Begli first gathered the 14 students at the workplace of Iskander Husseinov in Qom, and after a day of waiting and training, transferred them to a military unit near the Syrian capital, Damascus. According to some media outlets in the Republic of Azerbaijan, Ibrahim Begli immediately stated in Damascus that their intention was not only to fight ISIS, but also to prepare for an uprising in Azerbaijan.

However, the movement has stated that its sole purpose is to confront extremists and has no plans to expand its activities in Azerbaijan, to the extent that some members of this movement volunteered at their own choice in the 2020 Nagorno-Karabakh War in favor of Azerbaijan. Although according to Tawhid Ibrahim Begli, he did not support Azerbaijan and did not deploy fighters because of Israel’s support for Azerbaijan.

The movement was named by Qasem Soleimani.

Like the IRGC, Hezbollah, Al-Sabireen, and many other Shia militias allied to Iran, the flag of this group features a hand holding an assault rifle.

Ties with Iran
Tawhid Ibrahim Begli's father, Alam Ibrahimli, and his mother, Soodabeh Ibrahimli, originally from Lankaran, later settled in Mashhad.

In 2013, Tavhid Ibrahim Begli met with Seyyed Ali Khamenei, the supreme leader of Iran, during a meeting called "Ulema of the Ummah and the Islamic Awakening" as the chairman of the "Assembly of Fighting Clerics of the Republic of Azerbaijan". During the meeting, he spoke about the situation of Muslim prisoners in the Republic of Azerbaijan.

In 2017, Ibrahim Begli attended the "Memorial of the Martyrs of Nardaran" in Zanjan and spoke about the incident of an attack by the special police forces of the Azerbaijani Ministry of Interior in 2015 on the Shiites of Nardaran, which killed four residents.

The movement visited the tomb of Qasem Soleimani in Kerman in 2020.

In a message, the Islamic Resistance Movement of Azerbaijan congratulated Seyyed Ebrahim Raisi on his victory in the 2021 Iranian presidential election.

Crackdown and arrests of members
The members of this group who were fighting in Syria were mostly imprisoned or faced severe treatment by the government of Azerbaijan after returning.

Azerbaijani law enforcement agencies released information that Tawhid Ibrahim Begli, leader of this organization, who regularly made threats against Azerbaijan, called for the assassination of Elmar Valiyev, mayor of Ganja in January 2017 through the extremist Shi'ite Muslim website "nur-az.com". A year later, Yunis Safarov attempted to assassinate Elmar Valiyev.

Tawhid Ibrahim Begli has been accused of continuous and radical efforts against the government of Azerbaijan and was previously detained by the police during a protest rally in front of the Israeli embassy in Baku and was detained for 7 days by a court decision.

In 2020, the residence of Faleq Valiyev, a member of the movement, was identified in Russia, and he was arrested as part of an international search and was extradited to Azerbaijan on August 27. He was charged with "being a member of a criminal group (organization)", "training outside the Republic of Azerbaijan for terrorist purposes" and "participating in the activities of armed groups outside the laws of the Republic of Azerbaijan". He was sentenced to eight years in prison by the Ganja Crimes Court.

"Elmir Zahedov", a high-ranking member of the organization who was present in Syria, was imprisoned in Shaki prison in 2021.

Flag
The flag of the Islamic Resistance Movement of Azerbaijan has a yellow background, with their logo in green, featuring a globe with the map of Azerbaijan inside of it, as well as a hand holding a sniper rifle.

Above the logo it features Verse 39 from Al-Hajj, the 22nd chapter of the Quran, saying "Permission to fight back is hereby granted to those being oppressed, for they have been wronged. And Allah is truly the Most Capable of helping them prevail" (أُذِنَ لِلَّذِينَ يُقَاتَلُونَ بِأَنَّهُمْ ظُلِمُوا ۚ وَإِنَّ اللَّهَ عَلَىٰ نَصْرِهِمْ لَقَدِيرٌ)

Under the logo it features the Coat of Arms of Azerbaijan, and under the coat of arms it says "Hüseynçilər", meaning "Followers of Hussein" in the Azerbaijani language.

At the bottom, "Islamic Resistance Movement of Azerbaijan" is written in Azerbaijani, as well as its Arabic translation under it.

See also
Hezbollah

References

Anti-ISIL factions in Syria
Hezbollah
Islam-related controversies
Islamic Revolutionary Guard Corps
Islamist groups
Paramilitary organisations based in Iran
Pro-government factions of the Syrian civil war
Resistance movements
Khomeinist groups
Terrorism in Azerbaijan
Military units and formations established in 2015
Anti-Zionist organizations
Anti-Americanism
Jihadist groups in Syria
Anti-Western sentiment
Axis of Resistance
Islam in Azerbaijan
Azerbaijan–Iran relations
Azerbaijan–Syria relations
Iran–Syria relations